Pritam Singh (born 17 October 1924) was an Indian gymnast. He competed in seven events at the 1956 Summer Olympics.

References

External links
  

1924 births
Possibly living people
Indian male artistic gymnasts
Olympic gymnasts of India
Gymnasts at the 1956 Summer Olympics